The China–Japan football rivalry is a competitive sports rivalry that exists between the national football teams of the two countries, as well as their respective sets of fans. Historical tensions had stemmed this rivalry into one of the most heated rivalries in Asia and the world.

Men's matches 
The men's football teams of China (then called the Republic of China) and Japan first met each other in 1917 at the Far Eastern Championship Games, which Japan hosted.

Prior to the 1990s, China were one of Asia's dominant men's football teams while football in Japan was still limited to amateur levels, partly due to little interest in development for the sport. Thus, Japan suffered many defeats to China. But with the rapid rise of the Japanese men's national team since the 1990s, the tide has turned. Nowadays, Japan have become far more successful than China in men's football, winning four AFC Asian Cups and have played in every FIFA World Cup since 1998, while China are runners-up in two Asian Cups (one on home soil) and qualified for just one World Cup in 2002, which Japan co-hosted along with South Korea.

Head-to-head record

Women's matches

Head-to-head record

See also 
 China–Japan relations

References 

International association football rivalries
China national football team rivalries
Japan national football team rivalries
China–Japan relations